You're a Man Now, Boy is the debut studio album by British R&B singer and songwriter Raleigh Ritchie, released 26 February 2016 on Columbia Records. It entered the UK Albums Chart at number 32.

Composition 
In an interview with Billboard, Anderson explained that "I started putting the album together properly about two years ago. But the oldest song on the album, “Never Better,” is about four years old. I’ve written hundreds of songs, and I was still writing new stuff when I was putting the album together. It was just a matter of deciding how to construct it as something that made sense of how I was feeling." He also noted Kanye West’s album The College Dropout as a source of personal inspiration for his music.

Critical reception 

You're a Man Now, Boy received very positive reviews from critics upon release. Writing for The Evening Standard, John Aizlewood gave the album 4 stars out of 5 and described Raleigh Ritchie as "bold and cutting edge in a Jack Garratt sort of way and the fabulous The Last Romance is a life-affirming combination of confessional vocals and a massed gospel singalong. And for all the electro clutter of 'Werld Is Mine', the throaty rasp to his vocals and the smoother soul of the Stormzy-featuring 'Keep It Simple', he never loses his pop heart."

The Guardians Dave Simpson likewise gave the album 4 stars out of 5. Noting the lengthy writing and production process for the album, "If the problematic gestation means the mix of soul, R&B, electronica and cinematic orchestral sweeps can occasionally feel a trifle uneven, the Bristolian’s emotional deliveries bring a compelling vulnerability and humanity to the narrative-verse-to-big-chorus format." Simpson notes the title track as a highlight, writing that the track's "comparison of childhood dreams with adult realities ('I was an astronaut, once upon a time. I'm not growing up. I'm ageing') is beautifully moving."

MTV's Matt Tarr wrote very positively about the album. Like Simpson, he notes the title track as a highlight of the album as well as 'Stronger Than Ever' and as "the most powerfully emotive tracks on the album, both featuring dramatic rises and falls before eventually building to intense climactic ending". He also wrote that The orchestral instrumental of the prior is truly noteworthy and wouldn’t find itself amiss in a thrilling cinematic film trailer." Concluding the review, Tarr wrote that the album "is an incredible way to mark the humble beginning of an emotionally honest and sensitive artist on the mainstream stage and Raleigh Ritchie’s raw-yet-tender style is a joy to behold. Sure to catch the ear of new fans and current loyalists alike, this album will set the foundations for an exciting and boundary-pushing career in the UK music spotlight for a long while to come."

DJBooth's Lucas G. described the album as "a profoundly emotional album but just like in real life, that emotion is hidden under puns, smiles and spliff smoke. The thing I love most about the album is the way Ritchie wrestles with fear but doesn't wallow in. He stands at the top of the cliff staring into the void, occasionally dangling his feet over, but never jumping. At the same time the album struggles with adulthood identity, connections and love, the album has an upbeat, fresh sound to it."

 Track listing 

 Personnel 
Credits adapted from Tidal.Musicians Raleigh Ritchie – vocals , keyboards , background vocals 
 Paul Herman – guitar , background vocals , synthesizer 
 Corinne Bailey – French horn 
 Justin Broad – performance arrangement , programming , synthesizer , background vocals , bass , guitar , piano , drums , keyboards 
 Rosie Danvers – performance arrangement , cello 
 Dave Stewart – trombone 
 Mike Lovatt – trumpet 
 Richard Pryce – bass 
 Bryony James – cello 
 Chris Loco – keyboards, programming 
 Wez Clarke – programming 
 Wired Strings – strings 
 Emma Owens – viola , vocals 
 Nick Barr – viola , vocals 
 Alison Dods – violin 
 Debbie Widdup – violin 
 Gillon Cameron – violin 
 Helen Hathorn – violin 
 Jenny Sacha – violin 
 Kotona Sato – violin 
 Patrick Kiernan – violin 
 Sally Jackson – violin 
 Jane Oliver – cello 
 Mike Spencer – background vocals, bass, drums, guitar, keyboards, programming 
 Anna Croad – violin 
 Ellie Stamford – violin 
 Sarah Sexton – violin 
 Sam Skirrow – bass 
 Jillian Chambers – drums 
 Mike Elizondo – keyboards, programming 
 Stormzy – vocals 
 Aisling Loftus – background vocals , vocals 
 Kerenza – Peacock 
 Etta Bond – vocals 
 George Edward – programming 
 Utters – programming 
 James Bryan – guitar 
 Michael Asante – background vocals Technical'

 Jeremy Cooper – mastering engineer
 Dan Parry – mixing engineer 
 Wez Clarke – mixing engineer 
 Mike Spencer – mixing engineer, recording engineer 
 Mark Ralph – mixing engineer 
 James Reynolds – mixing engineer 
 Chris Loco – recording engineer 
 Nick Taylor – recording engineer , engineer 
 Justin Broad – recording engineer , engineer 
 Adam Hawkins – engineer 
 Brent Arrowood – engineer 
 Cody Acosta – engineer 
 Sam Klempner – assistant engineer

Chart performance

References 

2016 debut albums
Albums produced by Chris Loco
Albums produced by Sounwave
Columbia Records albums
Raleigh Ritchie albums